Kamaro, aka Goth Kāmāro, is a village and deh in Tando Bago taluka of Badin District, Sindh. As of 2017, it has a population of 1,471, in 348 households. It is part of the tapedar circle of Dadha.

References

Populated places in Badin District